The 2007 Macau Open Grand Prix Gold was a badminton tournament which took place in Macau from 2 to 7 October 2007. It had a total purse of $120,000.

Tournament 
The 2007 Macau Open Grand Prix Gold was the seventh tournament of the 2007 BWF Grand Prix Gold and Grand Prix and also part of the Macau Open championships, which had been held since 2006. This tournament was organized by the Badminton Federation of Macau and sanctioned by the BWF.

Venue 
This international tournament was held at IPM Multisport Pavilion in Macau.

Point distribution 
Below is the point distribution for each phase of the tournament based on the BWF points system for the BWF Grand Prix Gold event.

Prize money 
The total prize money for this tournament was US$120,000. Distribution of prize money was in accordance with BWF regulations.

Men's singles

Seeds 

 
 Bao Chunlai (quarter-finals)
 Chen Hong (quarter-finals)
 
 Chen Jin (champion)
 Taufik Hidayat (final)
 
 Shōji Satō (first round)
 
 Wong Choong Hann (semi-finals)
 Park Sung-hwan (semi-finals)
 Ng Wei (third round)
 
 Andrew Smith (second round)
 Roslin Hashim (quarter-finals)
 Chan Yan Kit (second round)

Finals

Top half

Section 1

Section 2

Bottom half

Section 3

Section 4

Women's singles

Seeds 

 
 Xie Xingfang (champion)
 
 
 Lu Lan (semi-finals)
 
 Yip Pui Yin (second round)
 Kaori Mori (first round)

Finals

Top half

Section 1

Section 2

Bottom half

Section 3

Section 4

Men's doubles

Seeds 

 Cai Yun / Fu Haifeng (semi-finals)
 Koo Kien Keat / Tan Boon Heong (champions)
 Markis Kido / Hendra Setiawan (semi-finals)
 Choong Tan Fook / Lee Wan Wah (final)
 Jung Jae-sung / Lee Yong-dae (quarter-finals)
 Luluk Hadiyanto / Alvent Yulianto (first round)
 Hwang Ji-man / Lee Jae-jin (quarter-finals)
 Shintaro Ikeda / Shuichi Sakamoto (first round)

Finals

Top half

Section 1

Section 2

Bottom half

Section 3

Section 4

Women's doubles

Seeds 

 Wei Yili / Zhang Yawen (quarter-finals)
 Gao Ling / Huang Sui (champions)
 Cheng Wen-hsing / Chien Yu-chin (semi-finals)
 Jiang Yanmei / Li Yujia (semi-finals)
 Yu Yang / Zhao Tingting (withdrew)
 Lee Hyo-jung / Lee Kyung-won (final)
 Aki Akao / Tomomi Matsuda (second round)
 Miyuki Maeda / Satoko Suetsuna (quarter-finals)

Finals

Top half

Section 1

Section 2

Bottom half

Section 3

Section 4

Mixed doubles

Seeds 

' Xie Zhongbo / Zhang Yawen (champions)
 Hendri Saputra / Li Yujia (quarter-finals)
 Keita Masuda / Miyuki Maeda (first round)
 Hendra Wijaya / Jiang Yanmei (first round)
 
 
 
 Han Sang-hoon / Lee Hyo-jung (semi-finals)

Finals

Top half

Section 1

Section 2

Bottom half

Section 3

Section 4

References

External links 
Tournament link
Tournament draw at badminton.de

Macau Open Badminton Championships
Macau Open
Macau Open